The Samsung NX100 is a 14.0 effective megapixel APS-C crop CMOS mirrorless interchangeable lens digital camera made by Samsung. It was announced on September 14, 2010.

Changes from NX10
 No built-in EVF or built-in flash. Instead, the hot-shoe supports:
 Optional external flashes
 Optional GPS adapter
 Optional EVF (23g, 320x240 (QVGA), 0.83x magnification, 98% coverage)
 Samsung i-Function compatibility at launch (was added to NX10 in a firmware upgrade)
 The kit lens is a smaller, non-OIS, collapsing 20-50mm iFn lens
 Lens Priority mode, which adjusts settings and menus depending on which lens is attached

See also
 Samsung NX series
 Samsung NX-mount

References

External links 

 Review at Imaging Resource
 Review at Steve's Digicams
 FaceBook NX Fan Page.
 Review at Camera Gear Guide
 Review at DigitalCameraInfo.com

Live-preview digital cameras
NX100
Cameras introduced in 2010